Cuigezhuang Station is a station on Line 15 of the Beijing Subway.

Station layout 
The station has an underground island platform.

Exits 
There are 2 exits, lettered B and D. Exit B is accessible.

References

External links 

Beijing Subway stations in Chaoyang District